1895 in Malaya.

Incumbents

Events 
 February 1895 – Pudu Prison in final construction stage and completed at the same year and used as the central prison in Selangor and Federated Malay States. The first governor of Pudu Prison was Lt. Col. J.A.B. Ellen.

 1895 – British Government establishing the Federated Malay States that including four States in Malaya
 Perak Commonwealth.
 Selangor Republic.
 Negeri Sembilan Union.
 Pahang Colony.

Births
 12 February – Onn Jaafar, seventh Menteri Besar of Johor and first President of the United Malays National Organisation (died 1962)
 24 August – Tuanku Abdul Rahman, first Yang di-Pertuan Agong of Malaya (died 1960)
 16 September – Zainal Abidin Ahmad, Malaysian writer and linguist (died 1973)
 20 December - Tun Yusuf, Abdul Malek bin Yusuf Grandfather. (died 1956)

Deaths 
 4 June – Sultan Abu Bakar, 1st Sultan of Modern Johor

See also
 1894 in Malaya 
 1896 in Malaya
 History of Malaysia

References

1800s in British Malaya
Malaya